Snow Beast is a 2011 horror film. It stars John Schneider, Jason London, Danielle Chuchran, Paul D. Hunt, and Kari Hawker.

Plot
A snowboarder at a Canadian ski lodge is enjoying the slopes when he finds himself in an unfamiliar isolated forest area. He attempts to find his way back but is followed and killed by a large beast. A few days later, wildlife researcher Jim Harwood and his resentful daughter Emmy, along with his research team of Rob and Marci, travel to the Canadian ski lodge as part of a study on the annual patterns of the Canadian lynx.

After arriving, Jim, Rob, and Marci find that the lynxes in the area seem to be missing. The trio sets up cameras, and a man stops at a mountain roadside to urinate, and the creature, revealed to be a Yeti, kills him. At the same time, a local ranger, Barry, begins tracking the recent disappearances of tourists in the area, localized around the lodge. As Jim, Rob, and Marci set up their cameras through the woods to capture lynx activity, two other tourists are hiking and killed by the Yeti.

The following day, Jim, Marci, Rob, and Emmy go into the forest to check the cameras. Near a camera, they encounter huge footprints in the snow. They return to their cabin, but nothing definitive is on the camera footage. That night while asleep in the cabin, a loud growling outside awakens the four. Checking the area in the morning, they find a destroyed snowmobile. Marci reports the attack to the ranger station nearby, and Barry records the incident along with others in the cluster of nearby disappearances. Ranger Gibbons is skeptical of any abnormal beast in the area.

Reviewing some of the remote camera feed footage from the cabin, Rob finds that one of the cameras has gone down. He and Jim leave on the remaining snowmobile to fix it, bringing a tranquilizer gun, while Emmy stays at the cabin and watches the cameras, communicating via walkie-talkies. Around this time, Rangers Barry and Gibbons leave to search the wooded area. While doing so, they are ambushed and killed by the Yeti. Elsewhere in the forest, Rob works on getting the downed camera up and running again with Emmy's help. He falls into a nearby cavern dug out in the snow, and Jim joins him in the pit, which ends up being a cavern of ice caves. When they find the body of the missing snowboarder, they leave in a panic just before the Yeti returns to its home. It chases Rob and Jim, but they narrowly escape in the snowmobile.

That night, Jim decides that they are all leaving the following morning after reporting the snowboarder's body. Marci disagrees and sneaks out in the early morning with the tranquilizer gun and a camera, leaving in Jim's truck. She stops to take some pictures and stumbles upon the Yeti eating one of its kills. It chases her and smashes her violently into the hood of Jim's truck, killing her and damaging the truck. When the others wake, Jim notices Marci's boots and equipment gone and searches for her by himself. Emmy radios to him when she sees the Yeti dragging Marci's body through the snow. Jim then encounters the Yeti himself and is attacked.

Emmy tries to convince Rob to help her search for her father, but night has nearly fallen. The Yeti attacks the cabin once the sun has set and breaks inside. Rob and Emmy barricade themselves in a bedroom with a dresser while the Yeti trashes the cabin before finally leaving. In the morning, Emmy manages to convince Rob to help her search for her father as he knows the location of the Yeti's den. He agrees, and they devise a distraction to lure the Yeti away. Rob manages to shoot the Yeti with tranquilizers, which downs him long enough for Rob and Emmy to enter the den. They find Jim barely alive when the yeti returns. Rob sacrifices himself, allowing Jim and Emmy to escape and the Yeti kills him then chases after Jim and Emmy. Jim cannot outrun the Yeti, so he shoots a flare into the snow-covered mountainside. He and Emmy take cover from the subsequent avalanche behind a thick tree, and the Yeti is buried in the snow. Jim and Emmy make it out alive and are seen later at home, where they reminisce about how no one will ever believe them. In a final scene, two hikers are coming up to a large snowdrift, and the Yeti bursts from the snow and attacks them.

Cast
 John Schneider as Jim Harwood
 Jason London as Ranger Barry
 Danielle Chuchran as Emmy Harwood
 Paul D. Hunt as Rob
 Kari Hawker as Marci
 Gregg Christensen as Snow Beast (in-suit performer)

References

External links
 

American monster movies
2011 films
2011 horror films
2010s monster movies
American horror drama films
American science fiction horror films
American natural horror films
2010s science fiction horror films
2011 drama films
Avalanches in film
2010s English-language films
2010s American films